Montpelier Township is a township in Muscatine County, Iowa, in the United States.

History
The first settlers were natives of Vermont, and they named the township for the capital of that state, Montpelier.

References

Townships in Muscatine County, Iowa
Townships in Iowa
1842 establishments in Iowa Territory